Morozko is a 1924 Soviet silent fantasy film directed by Yuri Zhelyabuzhsky and based on the Russian fairy tale Father Frost.

Plot summary
An old woman has a daughter she loves and a step-daughter, she tells her husband to take the step-daughter into the forest and leave her there for Father Frost. When Father Frost arrives he takes to her and leaves her riches. When the old man returns to collect the body of the step-daughter he is astonished, and relieved, to find her still alive. They return to the village where the old woman is horrified that the step-daughter is not only still alive but rich. She orders the old man to take her beloved daughter to the forest so that Father Frost can bestow wealth on her. When Father Frost arrives the daughter is rude to him and Father Frost leaves her to die. The old man returned to the forest and brings the dead girl back to the village and her distressed mother. The step-daughter marries a neighbour.

Cast
Boris Livanov		
Varvara Massalitinova		
Vasili Toporkov		
Klavdiya Yelenskaya

References

External links

1924 films
1920s fantasy films
Soviet silent feature films
Soviet fantasy films
Films based on Slavic mythology
Films based on Russian folklore
Soviet black-and-white films